The Medal of Honor was created during the American Civil War and is the highest military decoration presented by the United States to a member of its armed forces. Recipients must distinguish themselves at the risk of their own life above and beyond the call of duty in action against an enemy of the United States. The medal is presented to the recipient by the President of the United States.

Since it was instituted there have been 3,473 recipients; at least 17 American Jews have received the Medal of Honor for their actions starting in the American Civil War through the Vietnam War.  The first recipient of the medal was Benjamin B. Levy of the 1st New York Volunteer infantry for his service at the Battle of Glendale on June 30, 1862. The citation for his medal read: This soldier, a drummer boy, took the gun of a sick comrade, went into the fight, and when the color bearers were shot down, carried the colors and saved them from capture. He was only seventeen years old when he earned his medal. David Orbansky also received it for his actions in 1863 during the American Civil War. Samuel Gross was the only Jewish American Marine to receive the medal for his actions in Fort Riviere, Haiti. During World War II, medic Benjamin L. Salomon is accredited with killing 98 Japanese soldiers to cover for the retreat of wounded American soldiers. After repeated recommendations, he was posthumously granted the medal in 2002, 58 years after he was killed in action. The last to receive it was Tibor Rubin in 2005, who was believed to have been overlooked due to discrimination. His medal was for his actions in the Korean War in 1950, 55 years before he received the medal.

American Jews and the Medal of Honor
Depending on religious definitions and varying population data, the United States currently has the second largest Jewish community in the world (after Israel). The American Jewish population was estimated to be approximately 5,128,000 (1.7%) of the total population in 2008 (304,060,000). However, it may be as high as 6,444,000 (2.2%). As a contrast, Israel's Central Bureau of Statistics estimated the Israeli Jewish population was 5,435,800 in 2007.

The medal is bestowed "for conspicuous gallantry and intrepidity at the risk of life, above and beyond the call of duty, in actual combat against an armed enemy force" and the recipient must have distinguished themselves at the risk of their own life above and beyond the call of duty in action against an enemy of the United States. Due to the nature of this medal, it is commonly presented posthumously.

Until 1914 the Medal of Honor and the Purple Heart were the only medals that could be received so prior to 1916 the criteria for the Medal of Honor were much less restrictive than it is today. In 1916 however a board was established to ensure that future awards would be made only for the highest purposes, and some awards were rescinded.

Since the institution of the Medal of Honor, at least 17 have been presented to American Jews, of which four were received posthumously.

American Civil War

The American Civil War was a major conflict fought between the federal government of the United States and eleven of its member States which sought to secede and to create their own government, the Confederate States of America. It started on April 12, 1861, shortly after Abraham Lincoln was elected President of the United States, and ended four years later on April 9, 1865. During the war over 10,000 military engagements took place and more than 3 million people fought on both sides with 40% of the battles being fought in the states of Virginia and Tennessee.

Since its creation, 1522 servicemen have received the Medal of Honor for actions during the American Civil War and depending on sources, at least four were Jewish.

Note: Notes in quotations are derived or are copied from the official Medal of Honor citation

Indian Wars

Indian Wars is the name generally used in the United States to describe a series of conflicts between the colonial or federal government and the native people of North America. The wars, which ranged from the 17th-century to the early 1900s, generally resulted in the opening of Native American lands to further colonization, the conquest of American Indians and their assimilation, or forced relocation to Indian reservations.

From the time the Medal of Honor was created during the American Civil War, through the end of the Indian Wars there were 426 recipients who received it for actions in one of the Indian Wars, including one American Jew, Simon Suhler, who received it under the name Charles Gardner.

Note: Notes in quotations are derived or are copied from the official Medal of Honor citation

Haiti
In 1915 Haiti saw several bloody changes in Government leadership and the result was an unstable and dangerous environment for American citizens, business and interests. After a citizen led revolt overthrew and killed the brutal new dictator General Vilbrun Guillaume Sam within 6 months of seizing power President Woodrow Wilson ordered the United States Marines to restore order and protect American property and lives. When the Marines arrived they began engaging the rebel Cacos and in a battle that ended at Fort Riviere, Haiti and resulting in hand-to-hand combat, the Cacos were eliminated. After the battle six Marines received the Medal of Honor for their actions including Dan Daly, Smedley Butler and the only Jewish Marine to ever receive the Medal, Samuel Marguiles, who received it under the name Samuel Gross.

Note: Notes in quotations are derived or are copied from the official Medal of Honor citation

World War I

When World War I broke out, the United States initially maintained a policy of isolationism, avoiding conflict while trying to negotiate peace between the warring nations. However, when a German U-boat sank the British liner Lusitania in 1915, with 128 Americans aboard, U.S. President Woodrow Wilson vowed, "America isn't too proud to fight" and demanded an end to attacks on passenger ships. Germany complied and Wilson unsuccessfully tried to mediate a settlement. He repeatedly warned that the U.S. would not tolerate unrestricted submarine warfare, in violation of international law. In 1917, three years after the first shots of the war were fired, the United States entered the war and by the end of the conflict more than 4.7 million American soldiers, sailors and Marines would fight in the war.

More than 250,000 Jewish Americans served in the armed forces during the war with more than 3,000 killed in action and another 12,000 being gassed or wounded.

One hundred twenty four people would eventually receive the Medal for their actions during the war, four of them were Jewish. One of them, William Sawelson, received it posthumously, when he was killed by a machine gun attempting to assist another injured soldier.

Note: Notes in quotations are derived or are copied from the official Medal of Honor citation

World War II

During World War II 16.1 million American service members served and more than 650,000 of them were Jewish American men and women. More than 50,000 American Jews received medals during the war including five Medals of Honor.

Among the recipients were three Jewish Americans, Isadore S. Jachman, Ben L. Salomon and Raymond Zussman who all received it posthumously. Jachman and Salomon were both killed attempting to assist other fallen soldiers; Zussman's medal was received for risking his life on September 12, 1944, but he was killed less than a month later before receiving it.

Note: Notes in quotations are derived or are copied from the official Medal of Honor citation

Korean War

When Korea was split into two separate countries, North and South, along the 38th parallel tensions between the two countries were worsened when other countries began to get involved on both sides. The communist country of North Korea was supported by Russia, China and others, while the democratic South was supported by the United Nations and the United States. In 1950 the United States got involved and over the next three years more than 1.5 million US service members would serve in Korea. During the three years of the war 133 Medals of Honor were presented and although more than 150,000 Jewish American men and women were serving in Korea at that time, not one received the Medal of Honor.

On July 23, 1950 Tibor Rubin was serving as a rifleman in Korea when his unit was forced to retreat and he was ordered to stay behind and keep the road open for the withdrawing unit. During the 24-hour battle he single-handedly fought off an overwhelming number of North Korean troops, inflicting severe casualties on the attacking unit and assisted in the capture of many prisoners. A few months later Chinese forces staged a night-time assault on his unit and Rubin manned a machine gun allowing the unit to retreat southward, again inflicting heavy casualties on the attacking unit. During the battle he was severely wounded and was eventually captured by Chinese forces. Although the Chinese offered to release him early and return him to his native Hungary, he refused, remaining a prisoner and risking his life repeatedly by sneaking out at night to get food and medical supplies for other wounded prisoners.

A 1993 study commissioned by the United States Army to investigate racial discrimination in the awarding of medals. During the investigation it was determined that one Veteran American Jew and Holocaust survivor, Tibor Rubin, had been the subject of discrimination due to his religion and should have received the Medal of Honor. In 2005, 55 years later, President George W. Bush presented the Medal of Honor to Rubin in a ceremony at the White House, for his actions in 1950 during the Korean War.

Vietnam War

The Vietnam War was a military conflict between the Communist-supported Democratic Republic of Vietnam and the United States-supported Republic of Vietnam. It started in 1959 and concluded April 30, 1975 with the defeat and failure of the United States foreign policy in Vietnam.

During the Vietnam War, 246 Medals of Honor were received, 154 of them posthumously. Two American Jews received the Medal, Jack H. Jacobs from the Army and John Levitow from the Air Force.

Operation Freedom Sentinel

Operation Freedom's Sentinel (OFS) was the official name used by the U.S. government for the mission succeeding Operation Enduring Freedom (OEF) in continuation of the War in Afghanistan as part of the larger Global War on Terrorism. Operation Freedom's Sentinel is part of the NATO-led Resolute Support Mission, which began on January 1, 2015. OFS had two components: counterterrorism and working with allies as part of Resolute Support.

See also
 List of Jewish Americans in the military
 Jewish American military history

Notes

References
Inline

General

External links
 National Museum of American Jewish Military History Hall of Heroes

 
Medal of Honor
Lists of Medal of Honor recipients